Pete Chatmon (born June 1, 1977 in New York City) is an American director.

Life and career
Chatmon was born in New York City. A graduate of New York University's Tisch School of the Arts, Chatmon's work has been shown at over 25 film festivals around the world, including the Sundance Film Festival. His short films include: 3D, Chameleon, and Confessions of Cool. He is best known for writing, producing, and directing the independent feature film Premium, starring Dorian Missick, Zoe Saldana, Hill Harper, Eva Pigford, Frankie Faison, and William Sadler. Premium, nominated for a 2007 Best Independent Feature, Black Reel Award, has also earned the Honorary Mention Audience Award at the 2006 Urbanworld Film Festival as well as a New Visions, Special Jury Prize at the 2006 Bahamas International Film Festival.

Chatmon's next film is a documentary on the 761st Tank Battalion, narrated by Andre Braugher. He is developing several feature-length screenplays including What About Us?, The 4th, and an untitled hip-hop tribute.

In May 2019, Chatmon married Grey's Anatomy actress Kelly McCreary.

Filmography

Film

Television

References

External links

PeteChatmon.com

1977 births
Living people
African-American film directors
African-American television directors
American television directors
Film directors from New York City
Tisch School of the Arts alumni